The Touchstone is the second album by British jazz trio Azimuth featuring trumpeter Kenny Wheeler, vocalist Norma Winstone, and pianist John Taylor recorded in 1978 and released on the ECM label.

Reception

The AllMusic review by Michael G. Nastos awarded the album 3 stars calling it an "atmospheric recording".

The authors of the Penguin Guide to Jazz Recordings wrote that the album is "perhaps the group's masterpiece, combining jazz, classical and contemporary composition, and sheer sound in a mix that is as invigorating as it is thought-provoking." They singled out "See" as the outstanding track, describing it as "glorious."

Tyran Grillo, writing for Between Sound and Space, called the album "the group’s most enigmatic," and commented: "This is an elusive set... filled with quiet, seething power, but also one that builds its nests comfortably over our heads. It can only fly, because it knows no other way to travel."

Track listing
All compositions by John Taylor

 "Eulogy" - 10:26
 "Sylver" - 6:30
 "Mayday" - 5:31
 "Jero" - 6:21
 "Prelude" - 5:37
 "See" - 10:46

Personnel
Azimuth
John Taylor — piano, organ
Kenny Wheeler — trumpet, flugelhorn
Norma Winstone — vocals

References

ECM Records albums
Azimuth (band) albums
1979 albums
Albums produced by Manfred Eicher